HMS Actaeon was a modified  sloop of the Royal Navy. She was laid down by John I. Thornycroft & Company, Woolston, Southampton on 15 May 1944, and launched on 25 July 1945. The vessel was commissioned on 24 July 1946, with the pennant number U07.

Service in Royal Navy
On 14 January 1947, HMS Actaeon arrived in Simonstown, South Africa, to take up position and is regularly moored at Simonstown. It is this year that the sloop is officially reclassified as a frigate. In 1948, Actaeon made the first of its annual visits to the small port of Knysna.

From 17 April to 7 May 1952, Actaeon had her last recorded mooring date in the Selborne Graving Dock. On 14 January 1953, Actaeon ended her tour of duty at Cape Town station and returned to the UK to be decommissioned.

Service in West Germany 
As part of the rearmament for its new Bundesmarine in 1957, the Federal Republic of Germany (West Germany) takes over a total of seven Royal Navy ships as training frigates in the development phase of the Federal Navy, which, for the sake of simplicity, are grouped under the generic term of Class 138 school frigates, although they are by no means all identical.

Germany took over Actaeon, which had previously been reclassified as a frigate in British service, and is the only one of the seven ships that was not used during World War II. It was one three ships of the modified Black Swan class. Germany put the Actaeon into service in January 1959 as Hipper for the Mürwik Naval Academy, where the former sloop-of-war was used for cadet training alongside sister ship Graf Spee. In 1961, the vessel was placed under the command of training ships.

The armament of the ship was changed several times during its service in the Federal Navy.

Hipper came with two twin 102 mm L/45 Mk XVI cannon at the front, which were successively replaced. In addition, it carried three individual 40 mm Bofors guns of an older model. Finally, Hipper and Graf Spee were given twin 40 mm Bofors guns on the bow one above the other and at the end of the widened deck structure two single guns of this type side by side, because they were installed on the new ships of the German Navy.

During the vessel's tenure she undertook a number of foreign voyages, often with his sister ship Graf Spee, several times to North American port cities, from Victoria (British Columbia) in the north to Valparaiso and Cape Horn in the Pacific. Other ports visited ranged from Reykjavik in the north to Lomé, Togo and from Dar es Salaam, Tanzania in the south to Bangkok in the east.

The ship was taken out of service on 31 July 1964 after only five years of use. There were no plans to convert the frigate into an air traffic control ship due to her age. Hipper served as a pontoon in July 1964, then was sold on 25 October 1967 along with Graf Spee at Hamburg for scrapping.

References

Further reading 

 
 

Black Swan-class sloops
World War II sloops of the United Kingdom
Sloops of the United Kingdom
Ships built by John I. Thornycroft & Company
1945 ships
Korean War sloops of the United Kingdom
Maritime incidents in 1949